Royal Wharf is a residential and commercial development in Newham, London located on the north bank of the River Thames. It is built on the former site of Minoco Wharf and is near the Thames Barrier, west of Thames Barrier Park, and close to both West Silvertown and Pontoon Dock DLR stations.

The development is a joint venture between Ballymore Group and Singapore listed Oxley Holdings. It includes 3,385 residential units and 10,000 square metres of retail and commercial space.

History 
The  site was originally developed as an industrial works at the end of the nineteenth century and was also used for the manufacture of TNT during the First World War. Following this, the site was used by Shell UK for a period as an oil storage and refining site. This came to an end in the 1990s, when the site was left vacant.

Silvertown explosion 

Royal Wharf sits on the site of the Silvertown explosion, a large explosion at a munitions factory on 19 January 1917 which killed 73 people and injured more than 400, and caused substantial damage to the local area.  As part of the development, the Silvertown War Memorial was relocated to Royal Wharf Gardens, in the centre of the development.

Development 
In 2012, following a comprehensive consultation process with Newham Council officers, the Thames Gateway Development Corporation and local community stakeholders (including local groups and individual residents), planning permission was granted to redevelop the site with a mixed-use scheme, delivering 3,385 new homes, a new primary school, leisure facilities and retail and commercial office space.

, the development is nearly completed, with two blocks remaining. The Thames Clippers riverboat pier and Royal Wharf Primary School opened in 2020. The estimated number of occupants once the development is fully complete is around 10,000.

Ballymore is also developing the adjacent riverfront site to the west, Riverscape, to provide 769 homes.

Transport
West Silvertown and Pontoon Dock are the nearest stations on the Docklands Light Railway.
London bus route 241 serves the housing development.

The site is served by Thames Clippers ferry services from a new pier designed by Nex Architects. The service started on 18 October 2019 and of February 2020 is only served peak times.

References

External links
Royal Wharf Official Site

Lines 

Buildings and structures in the London Borough of Newham
Redevelopment projects in London
Silvertown